Meta Fust Willoughby (1887 - 3 October 1937) was an American composer, pianist, and singer who performed and published under the name Meta Schumann.

Schumann was born in St. Paul, Minnesota. Her first teacher was her father, the choral conductor and singer William Fust. Her brother, Carl J. Fust, was a violinist with the Minneapolis Symphony Orchestra. Schumann married Clarence Willoughby and they had one son, William.

Schumann studied music with C. C. Carman and Carina Mastinelli in Minnesota, and with John B. Acton in London.  She established a studio in New York City during the 1920s, and toured the U.S. as a singer and accompanist. She accompanied and coached Alma Beck, Henrietta Conrad, Edith Hallett Frank, Elena Gerhardt, Dusolina Giannini, Frieda Klink, Norman Jollif, Jane Laval, Eleanor Patterson, George Reimherr, Ottilie Schillig, William Simmons, Cornelius van Vliet, Frederic Warren, and Olga Warren. 

Schumann belonged to the New York Singing Teachers’ Association and sang with the Choral Society of the New York City Christian Science Institute. Her music was published by G. Ricordi & Company and White, Smith & Company. Schumann’s compositions, all for voice, include:

Cloudlets 

June Pastoral Song 

Medea

Night

Recompense (text by Josephine M. Fabricant) 

Spring

Thee (text by Florence Parr Gere)

Thou Immortal Night (text by Mina Verne Hammer) 

To a Star in June

When Thou Art Night (text by Thomas Moore)

Why Not?

Winding Lane

References 

American women composers
1887 births
1937 deaths
American women songwriters
Accompanists
Pseudonymous artists
Musicians from Saint Paul, Minnesota